Louis-Napoléon Fortin (August 8, 1850 – March 31, 1892) was a physician and political figure in Quebec. He represented Montmagny in the Legislative Assembly of Quebec from 1876 to 1883 as a Liberal and then Conservative member.

He was born in Cap-Saint-Ignace, the son of Louis Fortin and Marguerite Bernier. Fortin was the grandson of Jean-Baptiste Fortin. He was educated at the Collège de Sainte-Anne-de-la-Pocatière and the Université Laval. He qualified to practise in 1874 and set up his practice at Cap-Saint-Ignace. Fortier was first elected to the Quebec assembly in an 1876 by-election held after the election of Auguste-Charles-Philippe Landry was overturned. In 1879, he joined the Conservative caucus with three other members, leading to the defeat of the Liberal government. His election in 1881 was overturned after a decision by the Quebec Superior Court in 1883. Fortin was mayor of Cap-Saint-Ignace from 1881 to 1883. In 1881, he married Marie-Sophie-Laurette Larue. He was named a colonization inspector but was dismissed from that post in 1887. Fortin died at Cap-Saint-Ignace at the age of 41.

References
 

1850 births
1892 deaths
Quebec Liberal Party MNAs
Mayors of places in Quebec